Carlia rufilatus, the red-sided rainbow-skink, is a species of skink in the genus Carlia. It is endemic to Northern Territory and Western Australia in Australia.

References

Carlia
Reptiles described in 1974
Endemic fauna of Australia
Skinks of Australia
Taxa named by Glen Milton Storr